Clifton Centre is a tram stop on the Nottingham Express Transit (NET) network in the city of Nottingham suburb of Clifton. It is situated on street track within Southchurch Drive, and comprises a single island platform situated between the running tracks. The stop is on line 2 of the NET, from Clifton via the city centre to Phoenix Park. Trams run at frequencies that vary between 4 and 8 trams per hour, depending on the day and time of day. To the south of the stop, a reversing siding is located between the running tracks, allowing trams from the city centre to terminate at Clifton Centre and stand clear of through services.

Clifton Centre stop opened on 25 August 2015, along with the rest of NET's phase two.

Gallery

References

External links

Nottingham Express Transit stops
Railway stations in Great Britain opened in 2015
Clifton, Nottinghamshire